School Daze Revisited (also titled as School Daze Revisited...20 Years later) is a studio album released on September 18, 2007 by the Washington, D.C.-based go-go band E.U. & Friends. The album was dedicated to the Class of 1988.

Track listing

Personnel
Gregory "Sugar Bear" Elliott – vocals
Ajani Sekou – vocals
Earl Carter – vocals
Shorty Corleone – vocals
Duv Sac – vocals
The Lady Day Experience – vocals
Pretty Boy – vocals
Shy Thoro – vocals
Sweet Cherie – vocals
Thunda – vocals
Mike Corbett – composer
Paul Minor – mixing
Annie Sidley – composer, vocals
Steve Sidley – composer

References

2007 albums
Experience Unlimited albums